The Journal of Human Development and Capabilities is a peer-reviewed academic journal in the field of people-centered human development and capabilities. It is published by Routledge on behalf of the Human Development and Capability Association. It was established in 2000 as the Journal of Human Development, obtaining its current title in 2009. Its founding editors-in-chief were Khadija Haq (Mahbub ul Haq Human Development Center), Richard Jolly (Institute of Development Studies), and Sakiko Fukuda-Parr (United Nations Development Programme).

Abstracting and indexing 
The journal is abstracted and indexed in the International Bibliography of the Social Sciences, Social Sciences Citation Index, and Current Contents/Social & Behavioral Sciences. According to the Journal Citation Reports, the journal has a 2012 impact factor of 0.736.

References

External links 
 

Development studies journals
Taylor & Francis academic journals
Publications established in 2000
Quarterly journals
English-language journals